Sylvie Le Noach (born 2 July 1955) is a retired French swimmer. At the 1972 Summer Olympics, she competed in the 4 × 100 m medley relay and 100 m and 200 m backstroke, but did not reach the finals. She won a bronze medal in the 4 × 100 m freestyle relay at the 1974 European Aquatics Championships. She finished sixth in the same event at the 1976 Summer Olympics.

References

1955 births
Living people
Swimmers at the 1972 Summer Olympics
Swimmers at the 1976 Summer Olympics
Olympic swimmers of France
French female backstroke swimmers
European Aquatics Championships medalists in swimming
French female freestyle swimmers
20th-century French women
21st-century French women